Little Things Run The World  is the eighth album by bassist Ben Allison. It was released on the Palmetto Records label in 2008.

Track list
All compositions by Ben Allison, except where noted.
 Respiration
 Little Things Run The World
 Four Folk Songs
 Language of Love (Steve Cardenas)
 Roll Credits
 Blowback
 Jealous Guy (John Lennon)
 Man Size Safe

Personnel
 Ben Allison – Bass, Guitar
 Steve Cardenas – Guitar
 Ron Horton – Trumpet, Flugelhorn
 Michael Sarin – Drums
 Michael Blake – Sax (tracks 2,6,8)

References

External links
 benallison.com - Little Things Run The World

2008 albums
Ben Allison albums
Palmetto Records albums